The Gällivare Church is a wooden church building in Gällivare, Sweden. Belonging to the Gällivare Parish of the Church of Sweden, it was inaugurated in February 1882, replacing an older church.

References

External links

19th-century Church of Sweden church buildings
Churches in Norrbotten County
Churches completed in 1882
Wooden churches in Sweden
Churches in the Diocese of Luleå